Tuxentius cretosus, the savanna pied Pierrot, is a butterfly in the family Lycaenidae. It is found in Senegal, the Gambia, Burkina Faso, Ghana, Mali, Nigeria, Cameroon, Ethiopia, Somalia, Uganda and Kenya. The habitat consists of dry savanna and Guinea savanna.

The larval host plant also serves as the nectar source for the adults. Adult males mud-puddle.

The larvae feed on Ziziphus jujuba. They feed on the underside of the leaves of the host plant, eating only the outer cortex and never through the leaf.

Subspecies
Tuxentius cretosus cretosus (Ethiopia, coast of Kenya)
Tuxentius cretosus lactinatus (Butler, 1886) (Somalia)
Tuxentius cretosus nodieri (Oberthür, 1883) (Senegal, the Gambia, Burkina Faso, northern Ghana, Mali, northern Nigeria, northern Cameroon)
Tuxentius cretosus usemia (Neave, 1904) (Uganda, northern and western Kenya)

References

Butterflies described in 1876
Polyommatini
Butterflies of Africa
Taxa named by Arthur Gardiner Butler